Estadio San Jorge is a multi-use stadium in Olanchito, Honduras. It is currently used mostly for football matches and is the home stadium of Social Sol. The stadium holds 7,000 people.

References

San Jorge
C.D. Social Sol